Elachista gangabella is a moth of the family Elachistidae. It is found in all of Europe, except the Iberian Peninsula.

The head is blackish-grey.Forewings are blackish ; a straight somewhat inwardly oblique central whitish-yellowish fascia, in male narrowed towards costa ; tips of apical cilia whitish. Hindwings are dark grey.The larva is grey-green, yellowish-tinged ; head yellow-brown ; 2 with two pale brown spots.
 
Adults are on wing from March to June.

The larvae feed on tor-grass (Brachypodium pinnatum), false-brome (Brachypodium sylvaticum),  cock's-foot  (Dactylis glomerata) and mountain melick (Melica nutans). They mine the leaves of their host plant. The mine is transparent and generally descends from the leaf tip. A central silken tube stretches over the entire length of the mine which the larva uses to retreat in. The frass is deposited in this tube. Feeding takes place from within the tube. They are greyish white. Larvae can be found from September to November. They then hibernate within the mine. In spring, they leave the mine to pupate.

References

gangabella
Leaf miners
Moths described in 1850
Moths of Europe
Taxa named by Philipp Christoph Zeller